Aphytoceros hollandiae is a moth in the family Crambidae. It was described by Eugene G. Munroe in 1968. It is found in Papua New Guinea.

References

Moths described in 1968
Spilomelinae
Moths of New Guinea